Ceresia may refer to:
Ceresia Pers. a plant genus now known as Paspalum
Ceresia (katydid) Uvarov, 1928, a katydid genus with a single species, Ceresia pulchripes